Axway Software is a French-American publicly held information technology company that provides software tools for enterprise software,  enterprise application integration, business activity monitoring, business analytics, mobile application development and web API management. 

Since it split from parent company Sopra Steria in June 2011, Axway has been listed on Euronext Paris (AXW).

History 
Axway Software was incorporated on 28 December 2000 when the software infrastructure division of the French IT services company Sopra was spun-out as a subsidiary. (Sopra subsequently merged with another French IT services company Steria to form Sopra Steria in 2014.)

Sopra used Axway as a vehicle for expansion into the Enterprise Application Integration market. Subsequently, a number of acquisitions have been made by Axway. The Swedish company Viewlocity was acquired in early 2002.

Christophe Fabre became CEO of Axway in 2005 and remained in that position until 2015. Axway acquired the US company Cyclone Commerce in January 2006 after which much of the executive management of Axway relocated to Phoenix, Arizona. In February 2007, Axway acquired the Atos's B2B software business in Germany. US company Tumbleweed Communications was acquired in June 2008.

In June 2011, Axway was spun out of Sopra Group and listed on the Paris Euronext. In November 2012, the Irish company Vordel, an API Management vendor, was acquired. The Brazilian company, SCI Soluções, was acquired in September 2013. In January 2014, Axway acquired the assets of Information Gateway in Australia. Axway acquired French company Systar, a developer of Business Activity Monitoring software, in June 2014.

In January 2016, Axway acquired US company Appcelerator, creator of the Appcelerator Titanium open-source framework for multiplatform native mobile app development. Axway acquired US company Syncplicity, developer of a file share and synchronization service, in February 2017.

As of 2017, Sopra Steria holds 33.52% of Axway and Sopra GMT, a holding company for Sopra Steria and Axway, holds 21.65%. In May 2016, Sopra Steria acquired the 8.62% stake in Axway
formerly held by Société Générale. Axway is a component of the CAC Small.

In 2016, Axway had more than 11,000 customers in 100 countries. Since going public in 2011, annual revenues have grown from €217.2 million in 2011 to €301.1 million in 2016, and profits have grown from €35.3 million in 2011 to €50.8 million in 2016.

Products and services 
As of 2017, Axway's main products are:
 The AMPLIFY platform, which acts as a data integration platform for a number of formerly independent legacy products, including  Appcelerator Titanium. It provides a more uniform user interface to the various components.
 Cross File Transfer
 Syncplicity

Innovation 
Axway has been rated in Gartner's Magic Quadrant as a leader in API management for several years, and since 2022 by Forrester Research.

Company locations 
Axway is headquartered in Phoenix, Arizona and Puteaux, Paris. The company has development centers in France in Lyon and Paris, in Romania in Bucharest, in Bulgaria in Sofia and in the United States in Scottsdale, Arizona and Santa Clara, California. It also has various support centers, including one in Noida, India. The acquisition of SCI in 2013 lead to the establishment of the Axway South America regional headquarters in São Paulo, Brazil.

References

External links 
 Axway Software corporate site

Cloud applications
Software companies based in Arizona
Software companies of France
Software performance management
Development software companies
Enterprise application integration
Companies based in Phoenix, Arizona
Companies based in Paris
2011 initial public offerings
Software companies established in 2000
Companies listed on Euronext Paris
Software companies of the United States